The Eastern Conference is one of Major League Soccer's two conferences, along with the Western Conference.

As of 2023, the Eastern Conference contains fifteen teams. The conference has produced sixteen Supporters' Shield champions and ten MLS Cup winners in Major League Soccer's first 27 seasons. In 2000 and 2001, the conference was referred to as the Eastern Division when Major League Soccer briefly reorganized into three divisions.

2023 standings

Members

Current

Timeline

Conference lineups by year

1996–97 (5 teams)

Changes from 1995: Creation of the Major League Soccer.

1998–99 (6 teams)

Changes from 1997: New York/New Jersey MetroStars simplified their name to New York MetroStars; the Miami Fusion were added in the 1998 expansion.

2000–01 (as Eastern Division) (4 teams)

Changes from 1999: The Eastern Conference changed its name to Eastern Division with the creation of the Central Division; 
the Columbus Crew and the Tampa Bay Mutiny moved to the new division.

2002–04 (5 teams)

Changes from 2001: The Eastern Division changed back its name to Eastern Conference following the contraction of the Miami Fusion and the Tampa Bay Mutiny, resulting in the disbanding of the Central Division; Chicago Fire and Columbus Crew moved in from the Central Division

2005 (6 teams)

Changes from 2004: Kansas City Wizards moved in from the Western Conference

2006 (6 teams)

Changes from 2005: The New York MetroStars were bought by Red Bull and changed their name to New York Red Bulls.

2007–09 (7 teams)

Changes from 2006: Toronto FC was added as an expansion franchise.

2010 (8 teams)

Changes from 2009: The Philadelphia Union was added as an expansion franchise.

2011 (9 teams)

Changes from 2010: The Kansas City Wizards changed their name to Sporting Kansas City; Houston Dynamo moved in from the Western Conference.

2012–14 (10 teams)

Changes from 2011: The Montreal Impact was added as an expansion franchise

2015–16 (10 teams)

Changes from 2014: New York City FC and Orlando City SC were added as expansion franchises; Sporting Kansas City and Houston Dynamo moved out to the Western Conference; Columbus Crew adds "SC" to the official team name.

2017–18 (11 teams)

Changes from 2016: Atlanta United FC was added as an expansion franchise.

2019 (12 teams)

Changes from 2018: FC Cincinnati was added as an expansion franchise.

2020 (14 teams)

Changes from 2019: Inter Miami CF was added as an expansion franchise; Nashville SC was added since the MLS is Back Tournament up to the end of the 2020 season; Chicago Fire SC was renamed Chicago Fire FC.

2021 (14 teams)

Changes from 2020: Nashville SC moved in from the Western Conference; the
Montreal Impact was renamed Club de Foot Montréal. Columbus Crew SC was briefly renamed to Columbus SC and then to Columbus Crew.

2022 (14 teams)

Changes from 2021: Charlotte FC was added as a then-unnamed expansion franchise in 2019, with its first season initially set for 2021 but delayed by a year due to the COVID-19 pandemic. Nashville SC moved back to the Western Conference.

2023 (15 teams)

Changes from 2022: Nashville SC was moved back to the Eastern Conference as expansion side St. Louis City SC was added to the Western Conference.

Eastern Conference playoff champions by year
Note: The Conference Finals were a best-of-three series through 2001 (including the MLS semifinals in 2000 and 2001, when a conference playoff format was not used). Matches tied after regulation were decided by a shoot-out. In 2002, a similar format was used except that draws were allowed and the team earning the most points advanced. From 2003 through 2011, the Finals were a single match. Matches tied after regulation moved to extra time (Golden goal extra time was implemented for 2003 only), then a shoot-out if necessary. Beginning in 2012, the finals were a two-match aggregate series. The away goals rule for series that finished even on aggregate was first implemented in 2014. Extra time and shoot-outs are used if necessary, although away goals did not apply in extra time. In 2019, the playoffs returned to a single match format (including the Conference Finals), hosted by the higher ranked team through the regular season.

W – Western Conference team.

Eastern Conference regular season champions by year

^ – MLS did not have draws until the 2000 season.
† – Miami Fusion were declared winners of the Eastern Division in 2001 after the September 11, 2001 terrorist attacks forced the cancellation of the rest of the regular season. The MLS Cup Playoffs began on September 20.

See also
Western Conference (MLS)
Central Division (MLS)

References

External links 
Complete MLS History 

Major League Soccer
Divisions of sports leagues